Football Club 93 Bobigny-Bagnolet-Gagny, sometimes shortened to FC 93 B-B-G or FC 93, is a French football club based in the Paris suburb of Bobigny. The club was founded in 2013 as Académie de Football Bobigny by the de-merger of the football section of the multi-sport organisation Athlétic Club de Bobigny. It took its current name in 2020, after absorbing smaller local clubs Bagnolet Académie and USM Gagny. As of the 2022–23 season, the club plays in Championnat National 2, the fourth level of French football, having won back-to-back promotion in 2017 and 2018.

The club reached the round of 64 of the 2014–15 Coupe de France, losing 3–0 to Ligue 1 side Evian.

References

External links
 FC 93 at FFF.fr

Association football clubs established in 2013
2013 establishments in France
Sport in Seine-Saint-Denis
Football clubs in Paris